is a Japanese footballer who plays as a centre back for  club FC Tokyo.

Career statistics

Club

References

External links

2001 births
Living people
Association football people from Chiba Prefecture
Japanese footballers
Japan youth international footballers
Association football defenders
J1 League players
J2 League players
J3 League players
FC Tokyo players
FC Tokyo U-23 players
Kyoto Sanga FC players
SC Sagamihara players